Woodbine Community School District is a rural public school district in Woodbine, Iowa, United States. It is mostly in Harrison County, with small areas in Shelby and Monona counties, and serves Woodbine and the surrounding rural areas.

Schools 
The school district operates two schools, both in Woodbine:
 Woodbine Elementary School
 Woodbine High School

Woodbine High School

Athletics 
The Tigers compete in the Rolling Valley Conference in the following sports:

 Baseball
 Basketball
 Bowling 
 Cross Country
 Boys' - 2-time Class 1A State Champions (1986, 1987)
 Girls' 1984 Class 1A State Champions
 Football
 Golf 
 Soccer 
 Swimming
 Softball
 Track and Field
 Boys' - 2-time Class 1A State Champions (1989, 1992)
 Girls' - 4-time State Champions (1973, 1974, 1975, 1993)
 Volleyball
 Wrestling

See also
List of school districts in Iowa
List of high schools in Iowa

References

External links 
 

Education in Harrison County, Iowa
Education in Monona County, Iowa
Education in Shelby County, Iowa
School districts in Iowa